Maguette Ndiaye (born 1 September 1986), is a Senegalese football referee who is a listed international referee for FIFA since 2011.

Career

Ndiaye was selected to be a referee at the 2022 FIFA World Cup. He previously officiated at the Club World Cup, CAF Super Cup, AFCON finals, FIFA Under-20 World Cup, African Nations Championship, CAF Champions League and CAF Confederations Cup matches.

References

2022 FIFA World Cup referees
Living people
Senegalese football referees
1986 births